Lembeck is a village in the north of Dorsten which belongs to Recklinghausen in Nordrhein-Westfalen, Germany. Lembeck has 5,356 inhabitants (as of 2006) and is placed in the north Ruhr area, on the border with Münsterland. It is famous for its water castle “Schloss Lembeck”.

Economy
Lembeck presides over two business parks: one at the streets "Zur Reithalle“ and "Krusenhof” and the other a 1990s developed business park “Endelner Feld”, near the freeway A31. With the attraction “Schloss Lembeck” in the woodlands “Der Hagen” and the eastern border of the “Hohen Mark”, Lembeck has an important role in nature conservation.

Culture and Sights
At the "Schloss Lembeck“ there decrees at the raised ground floor of the main house a castle museum at the border of a direction, among other things “works of arts”, for example Chinese porcelain, Flemish Tapisserien, paintings and furniture from the Rococo and Empire periods, are shown.

The big ballroom, which was designed of Johann Conrad Schlaun (Schlaunscher Saal) in the style of the late baroque era, is of national importance. At the attic, the homeland-club “Lembeck” actuates since 1992 the Homeland-Museum, in which technical and agricultural equipments out of past time as soon as archeological founds, were shown (Opened Saturday and Sunday afternoon). In the ancient kitchen of the castle, at the basement of the main houses, there are again a gallery which shows paintings by the artist “Hans Hubertus Graf von Merveldt”.

References

Towns in North Rhine-Westphalia